Antonson is a surname and given name. Notable people with this name include the following:

Middle names
Ola Antonson Holsen (1808 – 1864), Norwegian politician
Jakob Mathias Antonson Lothe (1881 – 1975), Norwegian politician

Last names
Niklas Antonson, musician in 2000s Danish bands Slaraffenland & Efterklang and artist

See also

Antonsen
Antonsson

Patronymic surnames